Gregory Avenue Bridge, earlier known as the Main Avenue Bridge,  is road bridge over the Passaic River in northeastern New Jersey, United States. It is the 7th bridge to be built at the river crossing.
Originally built in 1905 as a moveable bridge, it has been in a fixed closed position since 1985. A four lane road carries traffic between  Passaic & Wallington at  the Passaic and Bergen county line.

Location and operations
The lower  of the  Passaic River downstream of the Dundee Dam is tidally influenced and channelized. Once one of the most heavily used waterways in the Port of New York and New Jersey, it remains partially navigable for commercial marine traffic. The bridge has been in fixed closed position since 1977 and only bridge at MP 11.7 and those downstream from it are required by federal regulations to open.

Acquackanonk Bridge 
The City of Passaic was originally part of Acquackanonk, and the area which would become Wallington, across the Passaic River, was a plantation owned by Walling Van Winkle.

The  first Acquackanonk Bridge, built sometime before 1741 during the  colonial era, was a foot bridge that crossed from Passaic just upstream of the location of the Gregory Avenue Bridge A second wooden bridge built from 1766 and was burned during Washington's 1776 Great Retreat from Fort Lee during the American Revolution. A nearby tavern was Washington's headquarters.

Another replacement was built in 1776, followed by three others which existed in the periods 1835–65, 1863–90, and 1890–1904.

Paterson Plank Road
Paterson Plank Road was completed over the crossing in 1841.
The company which built the Paterson and New York Plank Road, as it was called, received its charter on March 14, 1851. Over time it was upgraded and at one point had streetcar lines on its entire length operated by the Public Service Railway as the 15 Passaic, 17 Hudson, and 35 Secaucus.

Design, construction, adaptions
The Main Avenue (or Gregory Avenue) Bridge was built in 1906 by the Oswego Bridge Company. It is a swing bridge thru truss rim-bearing swing bridge  that rests on ashlar abutments, and carries two vehicular lanes and two sidewalks. Most of the bridge is riveted together, but the center tower uses eyebars in its construction. In 1985 both the operator's house on the bridge and the machinery below it were removed. The bridge deck was also replaced at the same time.

See also
 List of crossings of the Lower Passaic River
 List of crossings of the Hackensack River

References

Bridges over the Passaic River
Swing bridges in the United States
Buildings and structures in Passaic, New Jersey
Wallington, New Jersey
Bridges in Passaic County, New Jersey
Bridges in Bergen County, New Jersey
Bridges completed in 1905
1905 establishments in New Jersey
Road bridges in New Jersey
Oswego Bridge Company
Steel bridges in the United States